The  is the chief executive body of the government of Japan. It consists of the prime minister, who is appointed by the emperor after being nominated by the National Diet, in addition to up to nineteen other members, called Ministers of State.

The prime minister is nominated by the Diet, while the remaining ministers are appointed and dismissed by the prime minister. The Cabinet is collectively responsible to the Diet and must resign if a motion of no confidence is adopted by the Diet.

Appointment
Under the constitution, Cabinet ministers are appointed after the selection of the prime minister. A majority of the Cabinet, including the prime minister, must be members of the Diet, and all members must be civilians. Under the Cabinet Law, the number of Cabinet Ministers (excluding the prime minister) must be fourteen or less, but this may be increased to nineteen if a special need arises. If the Cabinet collectively resigns, it continues to exercise its functions until the appointment of a new prime minister. While they are in office, legal action may not be taken against Cabinet ministers without the consent of the prime minister. The Cabinet must resign en masse in the following circumstances:
When a motion of no confidence is adopted, or a vote of confidence defeated, by the House of Representatives, unless there is a dissolution of the house within ten days.
Upon the first convocation of the Diet after a general election to the House of Representatives (even if the same prime minister is to be re-elected and appointed, and every other minister is to be reappointed).
When the position of prime minister becomes vacant, or the prime minister declares his intention to resign.

Powers
The Cabinet exercises two kinds of power. Some of its powers are nominally exercised by the emperor with the binding "advice and approval" of the Cabinet. Other powers are explicitly vested in the Cabinet. Contrary to the practice in many constitutional monarchies, the emperor is not even the nominal chief executive. Instead, the Constitution explicitly vests executive authority in the Cabinet. Hence, nearly all of the day-to-day work of governing is done by the Cabinet.

In practice, much of the Cabinet's authority is exercised by the prime minister. Under the Constitution, the prime minister exercises "control and supervision" over the executive branch, and no law or Cabinet order can take effect without the prime minister's countersignature (and the emperor's promulgation). While Cabinet Ministers in most other parliamentary democracies theoretically have some freedom of action (within the limits of cabinet collective responsibility), the Japanese Cabinet is effectively an extension of the prime minister's authority.

According to Article 75 of the Constitution, Ministers of State are not subject to legal action without the consent of the prime minister during their tenure of office.

Powers exercised via the emperor
Promulgation of amendment of the constitution, laws, cabinet orders and treaties.
Convocation of the Diet.
Dissolution of the House of Representatives.
Proclamation of general elections to the Diet.
Receiving of foreign ambassadors and ministers.
Conferring of honours.

Explicit powers
Execution of the law.
Conduct of foreign affairs.
Conclusion of treaties (with the consent of the Diet).
Administration of the civil service.
Drafting of the budget (which must be adopted by the Diet).
Adoption of cabinet orders.
Granting of general amnesty, special amnesty, commutation of punishment, reprieve, and restoration of rights.
Signing of laws or cabinet orders by the relevant Minister of State and countersigned by the prime minister.
Appointment of the associate justices of the Supreme Court of Japan (except for the chief justice, who is nominated by the prime minister and formally appointed by the emperor).
Appointment of vice-ministers (who are nominated by their respective minister to whom they will report).

List of cabinets of Japan

Under edicts (1885–1947) 
Cabinets between 1885 and 1947 were formed under the cabinet edicts of 1885 and 1889. Cabinets were individually responsible to the emperor, and prime ministers were appointed.

Oligarchic "transcendent" (non-/anti-partisan) cabinets 

 1. Itō I
 2. Kuroda
 (2. Sanjō interim)
 3. Yamagata I
 4. Matsukata I
 5. Itō II
 6. Matsukata II
 7. Itō III
 8. Ōkuma I
 9. Yamagata II
 10. Itō IV
 11. Katsura I
 12. Saionji I
 13. Katsura II
 14. Saionji II
 15. Katsura III
 16. Yamamoto I
 17. Ōkuma II
 18. Terauchi

Interwar period / "Taishō democracy" party cabinets

 19. Hara
 20. Takahashi
 21. To. Katō
 22. Yamamoto II
 23. Kiyoura
 24. Ta. Katō
 25. Wakatsuki I
 26. G. Tanaka
 27. Hamaguchi
 28. Wakatsuki II
 29. Inukai

Wartime "national unity" cabinets

 30. Saitō
 31. Okada
 32. Hirota
 33. Hayashi
 34. Konoe I
 35. Hiranuma
 36. N. Abe
 37. Yonai
 38. Konoe II
 39. Konoe III
 40. Tōjō
 41. Koiso
 42. K. Suzuki

Under Allied occupation
 43. Higashikuni
 44. Shidehara
 45. Yoshida I (R)

Under constitution (1947–present) 
Cabinets since 1947 were formed under the Constitution of Japan. Cabinets were collectively responsible to the National Diet, and prime ministers were elected.

Occupation period, multi-party system

 46. Katayama
 47. Ashida
 48. Yoshida II
 49. Yoshida III (R1) (R2) (R3)
 50. Yoshida IV
 51. Yoshida V
 52. I. Hatoyama I
 53. I. Hatoyama II

LDP dominance

 54. I. Hatoyama III
 55. Ishibashi
 56. Kishi I (R)
 57. Kishi II (R)
 58. Ikeda I
 59. Ikeda II (R1) (R2) (R3)
 60. Ikeda III (R)
 61. Satō I (R1) (R2) (R3)
 62. Satō II (R1) (R2)
 63. Satō III (R)
 64. K. Tanaka I
 65. K. Tanaka II (R1) (R2)
 66. Miki (R)
 67. T. Fukuda (R)
 68. Ōhira I
 69. Ōhira II
 70. Z. Suzuki (R)
 71. Nakasone I
 72. Nakasone II (R1) (R2)
 73. Nakasone III
 74. Takeshita (R)
 75. Uno
 76. Kaifu I
 77. Kaifu II (R)
 78. Miyazawa (R)

"Lost decades" coalition cabinets

 79. Hosokawa
 80. Hata
 81. Murayama (R)
 82. Hashimoto I
 83. Hashimoto II  (R)
 84. Obuchi  (R1)   (R2)
 85. Mori I
 86. Mori II (R1) (R2)
 87. Koizumi I (R1) (R2)
 88. Koizumi II (R)
 89. Koizumi III (R)
 90. S. Abe I  (R)
 91. Y. Fukuda (R)
 92. Asō
 93. Y. Hatoyama
 94. Kan (R1) (R2)
 95. Noda (R1) (R2) (R3)
 96. S. Abe II (R)
 97. S. Abe III (R1) (R2) (R3)
 98. S. Abe IV (R1) (R2)
 99. Suga
 100. Kishida I
 101. Kishida II (R)

Current cabinet

See also
Third Kishida Cabinet
Prime Minister's Official Residence (Japan)
List of female cabinet ministers of Japan
Cabinet Office
Politics of Japan

References
The Japan Times. "Cabinet Profiles" [since 2008]. The Japan Times Online. Accessed 13 October 2012 from: https://web.archive.org/web/20040623111921/http://www.japantimes.com/cabinets.htm
Cabinet Secretariat, Office of Cabinet Public Relations, Japan (2003) prime minister of Japan and His Cabinet. Retrieved 28 Oct. 2003
Hunter, Janet (1984). Concise Dictionary of Modern Japanese History. Berkeley and Los Angeles: University of California Press, pp. 266–324, Appendix 5: Japanese Cabinets Since the Introduction of the Cabinet System in 1885 [to 1980].

External links
Official Website of the prime minister of Japan and His Cabinet
List of successive Japanese cabinets (in Japanese)
Previous Cabinets (Since 1996) and list of previous prime ministers (Since 1885) (in English)
Cabinet Office
Cabinet Secretariat (in Japanese only)
Cabinet Legislation Bureau

Notes

 
Government of Japan